Mumtaz (born 1948) is a Pakistani film actress who worked in Urdu and Punjabi movies during the 1970s and 1980s. She is known for her lead roles in the movies Pyaar Ka Mausam (1975), Mohabbat Zindagi Hai (1975), Jab Jab Phool Khile (1975), and Amber (1978). She won 5 Nigar awards in her long cinema career.

Early life and career

Mumtaz was born as Rifa'at in 1948 in Karachi. Before appearing in Lollywood films, she was quite popular for dancing at various functions in Karachi. 

She came to films in 1972. Her first film, Ehsaas, was directed by Nazar-ul-Islam and produced by Ilyas Rashidi. Along with Shabnam and Nadeem in the lead cast, Mumtaz had a small role in the film. She again played a small role in Shahid's and Rani's film Amrao Jaan Aada. Meanwhile, she had given a dance performance in a Punjabi film, Banarsi Thug (1973), to a song sung by Noor Jehan, with the lyrics Ankh Lari Badu Badi, Mouqa Miley Kadi Kadi. The song was filmed in a bar. This sensational song was a huge super hit and made Mumtaz famous overnight. After the film Banarasi Thug, Mumtaz's social film Sidha Raasta, starring Naghma, Yousuf Khan, and Sultan Rahi, became a diamond jubilee and Mumtaz became the center of attention for film fans across the country.

Mumtaz's first lead role film was Intezaar which was released in 1974. The film starred Mumtaz alongside Shabnam, Nadeem, Babra Sharif, and Mohammad Qavi. The heroine of this film was Shabnam, but the entire story of this film revolves around Mumtaz. In this film, Mumtaz was portrayed as a very modern girl. This film became a silver jubilee in Karachi. Just two weeks after the release of this film, Mumtaz's other film Shikaar was released, in which she appeared as a full heroine. In this film, Mumtaz played the role of a dumb girl against the hero Shahid, who was portrayed as a savage wild man. After the release of this film, Mumtaz dominated Pakistan's film industry and she became a busy actress. Her film Dushman, which was released at the end of 1974, also became a golden jubilee hit. The director of this film was Pervez Malik. In this film, Mumtaz played a lead role along with Waheed Murad and Muhammad Ali.

Dancing was the central attraction in Mumtaz's screen performances. In the movie Mohabbat Zindagi Hai, singer Nahid Akhtar's playback song "Tut Turu Tara Tara" was pictured on Mumtaz and she was much applauded for her dancing performance for that song.

Later, Mumtaz worked in several successful movies like Pyaar Ka Maasam (1975), Mohabbat Zindagi Hai (1975), Jab Jab Phool Khile (1975), Sheeshay Ka Ghar (1978), and Amber (1978). Her last film, Gangwa, was released in 1991.

Personal life
Reportedly, Mumtaz was in a relationship with film producer Chaudhry Ajmal during the late 1970s, though they were never married. Later, she married a businessman and moved to Canada. Now she lives in Canada with her family.

Selected filmography
Mumtaz acted in 202 Urdu and Punjabi films:

 1972: Ehsaas (Urdu)
 1972: Umrao Jaan Ada (Urdu)
 1973: Ziddi (Punjabi)
 1973: Banarsi Thug (Punjabi)
 1973: Rangeela Aur Munawar Zarif (Urdu)
 1974: Tum Salamat Raho (Urdu)
 1974: Sidha Rasta (Punjabi)
 1974: Naukar Wohti Da (Punjabi)
 1974: Intezar (Urdu)
 1974: Bhool (Urdu)
 1974: Dushman (Urdu)
 1974: Jadoo (Punjabi)
 1975: Pyar Ka Mousam (Urdu)
 1975: Mohabbat Zindagi Hay (Urdu)
 1975: Sharif Badmash (Punjabi)
 1975: Soorat Aur Seerat (Urdu)
 1975: Jab Jab Phool Khilay (Urdu)
 1975: Shoukan Melay Di (Punjabi)
 1976: Talash (Urdu)
 1976: Koshish (Urdu)
 1976: Ann Daata (Urdu)
 1977: Jabroo (Punjabi)
 1978: Amber (Urdu)
 1978: Sheeshay Ka Ghar (Urdu)
 1979: Nizam Daku (Punjabi)
 1979: Khushboo (Urdu)
 1979: Dubai Chalo (Punjabi)
 1980: Sohra Tay Jawai (Punjabi)
 1981: Sala Sahib (Punjabi)
 1981: Sangram (Urdu)
 1981: Veryam (Punjabi)
 1982: 2 Bhiga Zamin (Punjabi)
 1982: Noukar Tay Malik (Punjabi)
 1982: Shaan (Punjabi)
 1982: Zara Si Baat (Urdu)
 1983: Dillan day Souday (Punjabi)
 1983: Susral Chalo (Punjabi)
 1983: Raka (Punjabi)
 1983: Murad Khan (Punjabi)
 1984: Kalia (Punjabi)
 1985: Dhee Rani (Punjabi)
 1986: Zanjeer (Urdu)
 1987: Sangal (Punjabi)
 1987: Kundan (Urdu)
 1988: Mafroor (Punjabi)
 1990: Siren (Punjabi)
 1991: Kalay Chor (Punjabi/Urdu double version)
 1992: Zindagi (Punjabi/Urdu double version)

Awards

References

External links
 Mumtaz at IMDb

Living people
1948 births
People from Karachi
Pakistani film actresses
Nigar Award winners